Talbiya or Talbiyeh, officially Komemiyut, is an upscale neighborhood in Jerusalem, between Rehavia and Katamon. It was built in the 1920s and 1930s on land purchased from the Greek Orthodox Patriarchate of Jerusalem. Most of the early residents were affluent Christian Arabs who built elegant homes with Renaissance, Moorish and Arab architectural motifs, surrounded by trees and flowering gardens.

History

British Mandate 

After World War I, Constantine Salameh, a native of Beirut, bought land in Talbiya from the Greek Orthodox Patriarchate with the idea of building a prestigious neighborhood for Middle Eastern Christians. In addition to a villa for himself, Salameh built two apartment houses on the square that was named for him. Villa Salameh (1930), currently housing the Belgian Consulate at 21 Balfour Street, was designed in Art Deco style by French architect, .

Talbiya's Gan Hashoshanim (Rose Garden) dates back to the 1930s. After the establishment of the State of Israel, official Independence Day events were held at this park.

State of Israel
After the 1948 Palestine war many Arab residents of Talbiya including Salameh lost the right to their properties due to Israel's Absentee Property Law. Salameh sought to regain his property under a clause that distinguished between persons who left Israeli territory due to the conflict and those who were absent for other reasons, but after being convinced that the High Court would not rule in his favor for fear of creating a precedent he accepted a symbolic $700,000 in compensation for all of his multimillion-dollar properties located in Israel.

Before the 1967 Six-Day War, many of the villas in Talbiya housed foreign consulates. The home of Constantine Salameh, which he leased to the Belgian consulate, faces a flowering square, originally Salameh Square, later renamed Wingate Square to commemorate Orde Wingate, a British officer who trained members of the Haganah in the 1930s. Marcus Street is named for Colonel David (Mickey) Marcus, an officer in the U.S. army who volunteered to be a military advisor in the  1948 Arab–Israeli War.

The neighborhood's Hebrew name Komemiyut, introduced as a hebraization after the establishment of the state, never caught on, and it is still known as Talbiya.

Landmarks
Some of Jerusalem's important cultural institutions are located in Talbiya, among them the Jerusalem Theater, the Van Leer Institute and Beit HaNassi, the official residence of the President of Israel.

Property dispute
Some lands in Talbiya are owned by the Greek Orthodox Patriarchate of Jerusalem. In August 2016 a group of investors, which was called "Nayot Komemiyut Investments", purchased 500 dunams from the Patriarch, while a part of it was in Talbiya. Formerly, the lands had been leased by the Jewish National Fund (JNF) and were subleased to Israeli tenants who registered their leasehold rights in the Land registration in Israel, but the revenue was not paid to the Patriarch by the JNF. It was one of the reasons of selling the lands by the Patriarch to "Nayot Komemiyut", which committed to collect the rents for the Patriarch, as it was stated in a verdict of the Jerusalem District Court.

Selling the areas to a third hand aside the Patriarchate of Jerusalem and the JNF, puts the Israeli tenants, which most of them are elderly, under an economic uncertainty, while their real estate's value goes down. Tenants cannot design plans of TAMA 38 The investors are also unable to construct or widen the buildings, because the land is still leased by the JNF for several decades. The tenants requested the Israeli government to nationalize the leased lands, or at least to compensate them in real terms for their acquires, which were equal to real estate values. The Patriarchate reacted by claiming that its property rights were offended. In the beginning of 2018, Jerusalem Municipality joined the Israeli Government and refused to release the lands overwhelmingly, claiming it had to evaluate every leased estate for its betterment levy. As a result, the Christian Church leaders closed the Church of the Holy Sepulchre to visitors during the end of February 2018.

Notable residents 
Haim Yavin
Edward Said
Reuven Rivlin
Ya'akov Ne'eman
Martin Buber
David Friedman

References

Populated places established in the 1920s
Neighbourhoods of Jerusalem
Greek Orthodox Church of Jerusalem
Arab Christian communities in Israel